Huge is the fourth studio album by American alternative rock band Caroline's Spine. Most of the tracks on the album were re-recorded when the band was signed with Hollywood Records for their fifth album, Monsoon. The B-side featured several acoustic tracks, which were a significant departure from the band's usual electric guitar onslaught. Lead guitarist Mark Haugh even took the reins, writing and performing lead vocals for the song "On the Ground".

Track listing
All songs written by Jimmy Newquist
 "King For a Day"
 "Ouch"
 "Sullivan"
 "Hippie Boy"
 "Psycho"
 "Monsoon"
 "Necro"
 "Wallflower"
 "Trio'pain"
 "Jumpship"
 "Good Afternoon"
 "My World"
 "Forget"
 "Think About Me"
 "She's Coming Home"
 "On The Ground" (Haugh)
 "61"

Personnel
Jimmy Newquist - Vocals, Guitar, Bass
Jason Gilardi - Drums
Mark Haugh - Guitar
Scott Jones - Bass

Production
Produced by Dan Calderone & Caroline's Spine
All words and music by James P. Newquist except "On the Ground," which was written and sung by Mark Haugh
Music published by Archaic Music (BMI)
Photos by Jocelyn Balthasar, Kim Kusler, Stephanie Thornton, Ivan Massar, Bob Newquist, plus any strangers we asked along the way.
Layout & Design: Mark Haugh, Jimmy Newquist, and Joe Statt for ANZA
Recorded, mixed, & mastered at ANZA, San Diego, CA

1996 albums
Caroline's Spine albums